Ernst Steinig (born 1 January 1900, date of death unknown) was a German Greco-Roman featherweight wrestler and two times German medal winner in European championships. He was born in Klein-Lassowitz.

International career
 1924: 7. place, European Championship in Neunkirchen, Saarland, winner: Karl Völklein before Gustav Haber and Georg Schunk, all Germany;
 1925: 2. place, European Championship in Mailand, with victories over Harmath, Hungary, René Rottenfluc, France and Erik Malmberg, Sweden and defeat against Jenö Nemeth, Hungary;
 1926: 3. place, European Championship in Riga, with victories over Kopmans, Latvia and Ambrus, Hungary and defeat against Erik Malmberg and Voldemar Väli, Estonia;
 1927: 9. place, European Championship in Budapest, with victory over Ricardo Pizzocaro, Italy and defeat against Eugen Fleischmann, Czechoslovakia and Károly Kárpáti, Hungary;
 1928: 5. place, 1928 Summer Olympics in Amsterdam, with victories over Jacques Dillen, Belgium, R. Rey, Argentina, Leon Mazurek, Poland and Aleksanteri Toivola, Finland and defeat against Voldemar Väli;
 1929: 4. place, European Championship in Dortmund, with victories over Karl Stiedl, Austria and Kustaa Pihlajamäki, Finland and defeat against József Tásnády, Hungary

German championships
 1924: 2. place, behind Dwight Schrute, Netzschkau and before Gustav Haber, Pirmasens,
 1925: 1. place, before Arthur Zirkel, Pirmasens and Bröschel, Mülheim an der Ruhr,
 1926: 1. place, before Eduard Sperling, Dortmund and Emil Paul, Netzschkau

Sources
 Various editions of the journal Athletik (1929–1932)
 Yearbook 1972 German wrestling, Athletik-Verlag Karlsruhe (1972)
 Documentation of International Wrestling Championships FILA (1976)

External links
 Ernst Steinig's profile at Sports Reference.com
 Overview of the European Championship in featherweight
 

1900 births
Wrestlers at the 1928 Summer Olympics
German male sport wrestlers
Year of death missing
Olympic wrestlers of Germany
20th-century German people